The 1987 Castilian-Leonese regional election was held on Wednesday, 10 June 1987, to elect the 2nd Cortes of the autonomous community of Castile and León. All 84 seats in the Cortes were up for election. The election was held simultaneously with regional elections in twelve other autonomous communities and local elections all throughout Spain, as well as the 1987 European Parliament election.

Expectations for the ruling Spanish Socialist Workers' Party (PSOE) were low after the resignation in October 1986 of former president Demetrio Madrid, besieged by a judicial investigation on the alleged fraudulent sale of a former textile company of his property and by internal opposition from within his party. The election saw both the PSOE and the opposition People's Alliance (AP)—which ran on its own after the break up of the People's Coalition with the People's Democratic Party (PDP) and the Liberal Party (PL) the previous year—lose ground to the Democratic and Social Centre (CDS) which, with 18 seats and 19.4% of the share, scored the best result for a third party in a Castilian-Leonese regional election to date. The PDP was able to win one seat by Segovia, with Castile and León becoming one of the only two autonomous communities—the other being Navarre—in which the party was able to secure parliamentary representation. In Burgos, a breakway party, Independent Solution (SI), formed by the incumbent mayor of its capital city José María Peña San Martín, obtained one seat in the regional Cortes.

As a result of the election, the support of PDP and SI procurators and the decisive abstention of the CDS, AP candidate José María Aznar was able to become president of the Junta of Castile and León, replacing Socialist José Constantino Nalda and starting an uninterrupted stay of over three decades in power for AP and its successor, the People's Party (PP). Aznar's presidency would last until 1989, when he would resign to Jesús Posada in order to become the PP's national leader and, in 1996, prime minister of Spain.

Overview

Electoral system
The Cortes of Castile and León were the devolved, unicameral legislature of the autonomous community of Castile and León, having legislative power in regional matters as defined by the Spanish Constitution and the Castilian-Leonese Statute of Autonomy, as well as the ability to vote confidence in or withdraw it from a regional president.

Voting for the Cortes was on the basis of universal suffrage, which comprised all nationals over 18 years of age, registered in Castile and León and in full enjoyment of their political rights. All members of the Cortes of Castile and León were elected using the D'Hondt method and a closed list proportional representation, with an electoral threshold of three percent of valid votes—which included blank ballots—being applied in each constituency. Seats were allocated to constituencies, corresponding to the provinces of Ávila, Burgos, León, Palencia, Salamanca, Segovia, Soria, Valladolid and Zamora, with each being allocated an initial minimum of three seats, as well as one additional member per each 45,000 inhabitants or fraction greater than 22,500.

The use of the D'Hondt method might result in a higher effective threshold, depending on the district magnitude.

Election date
The term of the Cortes of Castile and León expired four years after the date of their previous election. The election decree was required to be issued no later than the twenty-fifth day prior to the date of expiry of parliament and published on the following day in the Official Gazette of Castile and León, with election day taking place between the fifty-fourth and the sixtieth day from publication and set so as to make it coincide with elections to the regional assemblies of other autonomous communities. The previous election was held on 8 May 1983, which meant that the legislature's term would have expired on 8 May 1987. The election decree was required to be published no later than 14 April 1987, with the election taking place no later than the sixtieth day from publication, setting the latest possible election date for the Cortes on Saturday, 13 June 1987.

The Cortes of Castile and León could not be dissolved before the date of expiry of parliament except in the event of an investiture process failing to elect a regional president within a two-month period from the first ballot. In such a case, the Cortes were to be automatically dissolved and a snap election called, with elected procurators merely serving out what remained of their four-year terms.

Parliamentary composition
The Cortes of Castile and León were officially dissolved on 14 April 1987, after the publication of the dissolution decree in the Official Gazette of Castile and León. The table below shows the composition of the parliamentary groups in the Cortes at the time of dissolution.

Parties and candidates
The electoral law allowed for parties and federations registered in the interior ministry, coalitions and groupings of electors to present lists of candidates. Parties and federations intending to form a coalition ahead of an election were required to inform the relevant Electoral Commission within ten days of the election call, whereas groupings of electors needed to secure the signature of at least one percent of the electorate in the constituencies for which they sought election, disallowing electors from signing for more than one list of candidates.

Below is a list of the main parties and electoral alliances which contested the election:

Opinion polls
The table below lists voting intention estimates in reverse chronological order, showing the most recent first and using the dates when the survey fieldwork was done, as opposed to the date of publication. Where the fieldwork dates are unknown, the date of publication is given instead. The highest percentage figure in each polling survey is displayed with its background shaded in the leading party's colour. If a tie ensues, this is applied to the figures with the highest percentages. The "Lead" column on the right shows the percentage-point difference between the parties with the highest percentages in a poll. When available, seat projections determined by the polling organisations are displayed below (or in place of) the percentages in a smaller font; 43 seats were required for an absolute majority in the Cortes of Castile and León.

Results

Overall

Distribution by constituency

Aftermath

Government formation

1989 investiture

Notes

References
Opinion poll sources

Other

1987 in Castile and León
Castile and León
Regional elections in Castile and León
June 1987 events in Europe